Niederglatt is a municipality in the district of Dielsdorf in the canton of Zürich in Switzerland.

History
Niederglatt is first mentioned in 1149 as Niderunglatto.  Between 1153 and 1155 it was mentioned as Nidrunglate.
Until 1840 it was part of the municipality of Niederhasli.

Geography
Of this area, 58.1% is used for agricultural purposes, while 6.4% is forested. Of the rest of the land, 30.8% is settled (buildings or roads) and the remainder (4.7%) is non-productive (rivers, glaciers or mountains).

The municipality is located on both banks of the Glatt river.  It includes the villages of Niederglatt and Nöschikon.

Demographics
, 20.9% of the population was made up of foreign nationals. Over the last 10 years the population has grown at a rate of 26.1%. Most of the population speaks German  (87.9%), with Italian being second most common ( 4.7%) and Albanian being third ( 1.7%).

In the 2007 election the most popular party was the SVP which received 50% of the vote.  The next three most popular parties were the SPS (12.5%), the FDP (10.8%) and the CVP (8.3%).

The age distribution of the population is children and teenagers (0–19 years old) make up 23.3% of the population, while adults (20–64 years old) make up 65.1% and seniors (over 64 years old) make up 11.6%.  In Niederglatt about 77.4% of the population (between age 25-64) have completed either non-mandatory upper secondary education or additional higher education (either university or a Fachhochschule).  

Niederglatt has an unemployment rate of 2.58%.  , there were 62 people employed in the primary economic sector and about 16 businesses involved in this sector.  317 people are employed in the secondary sector and there are 31 businesses in this sector.  716 people are employed in the tertiary sector, with 107 businesses in this sector.

The historical population is given in the following table:

Transport 
Niederglatt railway station is a stop of the Zürich S-Bahn on the line S9. Its train station is a 20 minute ride from Zürich Hauptbahnhof.

References

External links 

  

Municipalities of the canton of Zürich